Donnelly is a surname of Irish origin. It is the anglicized form of the Gaelic Ó Donnghaile meaning "descendant of Donnghal" a given name composed of the elements "donn" (dark or brown), plus "gal" (valour). O'Donnelly is derived from the descendants of Donnghal, the great grandson of Domhnall, King of Ailech. Early ancestors of this surname were a part of Cenél nEoghain, a branch of the Northern Uí Néill. 

It is most commonly found in Ulster, especially in County Tyrone and County Armagh and in parts of County Donegal. It was so common in Roscommon that at some point, a branch of people with the Donnelly surname took on the name of Briscoe instead.

Surname

 Alan Donnelly (born 1957), British politician and former trade unionist
 Arthur Barrett Donnelly (1875–1919), US Army general
 Brendan Donnelly (born 1950), British politician
 Brendan Donnelly (born 1971), baseball player
 Brian Donnelly (disambiguation)
 Charles Donnelly (disambiguation)
 Charley Donnelly (1885–1967), American educator, golfer, and football and golf coach
 Christine Donnelly, founder and CEO of the Aboriginal Dance Theatre Redfern in Sydney, Australia
 Ciaran Donnelly (born 1984), English footballer
 Dan Donnelly (disambiguation)
 Danny Donnelly (politician), Northern Irish politician
 Davis A. Donnelly (1927–2020), Wisconsin senator
 Declan Donnelly (born 1975), English television presenter, producer and actor, one half of Ant & Dec
 Desmond Donnelly (1920–1974), British politician, author and journalist
 Dick Donnelly (1941–2016), Scottish football player, journalist and broadcaster
 Donal Donnelly (1931–2010), Irish theatre and film actor
 Dougie Donnelly (born 1953), Scottish television presenter
 Edward Terence Donnelly (1871–1929), US Army general
 Elfie Donnelly (born 1950), British-Austrian children books writer
 Fin Donnelly (born 1966), Canadian politician
 Gary Donnelly (born 1962), American tennis player
 Gary Donnelly, Irish republican
 Greg Donnelly, Australian politician 
 Henry Edmund Donnelly (1904–1967), American Catholic bishop
 Ian Donnelly (1981), Australian rugby league footballer
 Ignatius L. Donnelly (1831–1901), Minnesota politician
 Jack Donnelly (born 1985), English actor
 James S. Donnelly Jr. (born 1943), American historian
 Jamie Donnelly (born 1947), American actress
 Jason Donnelly (born 1970), New Zealand rugby league footballer
 Jennifer Donnelly (born 1963), American novelist
 Joe Donnelly (born 1955), American attorney and politician
 Joseph Francis Donnelly (1909–1977), American Catholic bishop
 John Donnelly (disambiguation)
 Ken Donnelly (born 1950–2017), American politician
 Kieran Donnelly, Irish Gaelic footballer
 Liza Donnelly, American cartoonist and writer
 Luke Donnelly (born 1996), Scottish footballer
 Laura Donnelly (born 1982), Irish actress
Meg Donnelly (born 2000), American singer and actress 
 Malcolm Donnelly (born 1943), Australian baritone singer
 Mark Donnelly (born 1955), Professor, Publisher, Author 
 Martin Donnelly (disambiguation)
 Mattie Donnelly, Irish Gaelic footballer
 Mattie Donnelly, Irish hurler
 Melinda Romero Donnelly (born 1971), Puerto Rico politician
 Michael Donnelly (1927–1982), Roman Catholic priest from Ireland
 Michael Donnelly (1959–2005), Gulf War veteran, activist, and author
 Mike Donnelly (born 1963), American hockey player
 Patrick Donnelly (disambiguation)
 Peter Donnelly (born 1959), Australian mathematician
 Peter F. Donnelly (1938–2009), American patron of the arts
 Phil M. Donnelly (1891–1961), Missouri governor 1945-49 and 1953–57
 Rich Donnelly (born 1946), American baseball coach
 Ruth Donnelly (1896–1982), American stage and film actress
 Ryann Donnelly, American musician
 Scott Donnelly (born 1987), English football player
 Scott C. Donnelly (born 1961), Chief Operating Officer of Textron
 Seamus Donnelly (disambiguation)
 Shannon Donnelly, Children's novelist
 Sharon Donnelly (born 1967), Canadian athlete
 Simon Donnelly (born 1971), Scottish footballer
 Tanya Donelly (born 1966), American musician
 Thomas Donnelly (Saskatchewan politician) (Thomas F. Donnelly, 1874–1948), Canadian member of Parliament
 Thomas Donnelly (sergeant-at-arms) (1764–1835), New York legislative officer
 Thomas Donnelly (writer) (born 1953), American writer and director of the Center for Defense Studies at the American Enterprise Institute
 Thomas Charles Donnelly (born 1933), former Alberta MLA
 Thomas Dean Donnelly, American screenwriter
 Thomas F. Donnelly (New York City) (1863–1924), New York politician and judge
 Tim Donnelly, (1944–2021), American film and television actor
 Tom Donnelly (Thomas Mathew Donnelly, born 1981), New Zealand rugby union player
 Tom Donnelly (footballer) (born 1947), Scottish footballer for Motherwell and East Stirlingshire
 Tommy Donnelly (footballer), Irish association football player
 William Donnelly (disambiguation)
 The Black Donnellys, a feuding Canadian family

Fictional people
 Elizabeth Donnelly, character in American crime drama, Law & Order: Special Victims Unit
 Glen Donnelly, character from Australian soap opera, Neighbours
 Helen Elliott Donnelly, character in American soap opera, Love is a Many Splendored Thing

Other spellings

Donnally (disambiguation)

See also
 Castlecaulfield
 Irish nobility
 O'Neill dynasty
 Cenel nEoghain
 List of Irish clans

References

English-language surnames
Surnames of Irish origin
Anglicised Irish-language surnames